Wayne Township is one of twelve townships in Buchanan County, Missouri, USA.  As of the 2010 census, its population was 683.

Wayne Township was established in 1842.

Geography
It contains two cemeteries: Bethel and Kerlin.

Horseshoe Lake, Muskrat Lake, New Mud Lake and Old Mud Lake are within this township. The stream of Contrary Creek runs through this township.

References

External links
 US-Counties.com
 City-Data.com
 USGS Geographic Names Information System (GNIS)

Townships in Buchanan County, Missouri
Townships in Missouri